Parliamentary elections were held in Belarus on 28 September 2008. The 110 seats in the House of Representatives were at stake.

Lidia Yermoshina, the Chairperson of the Central Election Commission, announced on 29 August that 276 candidates were registered for the election; 365 people initially sought to run, but five withdrew and candidate registration for 84 others was rejected. Just prior to the election, the number of the registered candidates was reduced to 263; 82 of the candidates were members of political parties, the others were non-partisans loyal to the government. They included chief executives of local authorities and medical institutions, and top managers of large enterprises. The election was attempted to be monitored by 925 international and more than 17,000 local observers, including an Organization for Security and Co-operation in Europe (OSCE) mission consisting of some 450 members from 43 countries. Belarusian citizens abroad were able to cast their votes at 40 polling stations located in 31 countries. Advance voting occurred on September 23 through September 26 and was characterized by active participation: more than 26% of registered voters cast their ballots. Voter turnout was reported to be 76.7%.

According to the OSCE, the elections were undemocratic and the work of international observers was seriously hindered as the observers were refused access to the facilities where the votes were counted. But according to a CIS election observation mission, the elections in Belarus conformed to international standards.

Results
According to the official results the oppositional parties failed to gain any of the 110 available seats, all of which were given to parties and non-partisan candidates loyal to president Alexander Lukashenko. The Central Election Commission declared this to be due to the overwhelming popular fear of mass demonstrations and of the "radical political changes" demanded by the opposition. This declaration was met with immediate anti-governmental demonstrations in the centre of Minsk protesting against electoral fraud. President Lukashenko commented that the opposition in Belarus is financed by foreign countries and is not needed.

References

External links
Belarus' election paradox by Natalia Leshchenko
First report of OSCE (Atmosphere before elections)
Parliamentary Election in Belarus 2008 on Google Maps

Belarus
Parliament
Parliamentary elections in Belarus
Election and referendum articles with incomplete results